XXXVI Brigade, Royal Field Artillery was a brigade of the Royal Field Artillery which served in the First World War. 

It was originally formed with 15th, 48th and 71st Batteries, and attached to 2nd Infantry Division.  On 4 August 1914 it mobilised at Aldershot and was brought up to strength with reservists and drafts from other units; an Ammunition Column was also formed. It was sent to the Continent with the British Expeditionary Force, disembarking at Boulogne 19 August 1914. 
It saw service with 2nd Division throughout the war.  A howitzer battery was formed in May 1916, from a section of each of 47th (Howitzer) and 56th (Howitzer) Batteries, and designated D Battery.

The officers who landed in France with the Brigade included:
36th Brigade Commander  - Lt Col Ernest Frederick Hall; 
Adjutant - Capt H H Hulton, 
Medical officer - Captain Patrick Sampson RAMC,
Veterinary Officer - Lt R F Stirling AVC, 

15th Battery:
Major Christopher Chevallier Barnes,
Major Laurence Godman (vice Capt. E. C. Anstey),
Lt. Pierre Elliot Inchbald, 
2nd Lt. Victor Walrond, 
2nd Lt Neil James Robert Wright 

48th Battery:
Maj Cosmo Gordon Stewart DSO,
Capt. Richmond Ffolliott Powell, 
Lt Donald Ramsey MacDonald,
Lt C. W. Campbell,
2Lt Arthur Lefrey Pritchard Griffith

71st Battery:
Maj. C. W. Scott, 
Capt. William Cecil Holt Cree, 
Lt Melvil Farrant,
2nd Lt A Chaworth-Musters,
2nd Lt Archibald Charles Mark Walsh 

36th Brigade Ammunition Column:
Capt. Robert Hadden Haining,
Lt Christopher Geldard, 
Lt Percival Llewellyn Vining 

Warrant officers and senior NCOs on mobilisation included
RSM Andrew Imlach (15982); 
15th Battery - BSM Bert Avery (18958); BQMS Thomas Wallace Coles (30543); 
48th Battery - BSM Arthur Frank Pilcher (11352); BQMS William Charles Smith (23664);  
71st Battery - BSM David William  Phillpotts (22245); BQMS Charles John Read (19995);
36th Brigade Ammunition Column - BSM Frederick Bradford (13922);

External links
Royal Field Artillery Brigades
2nd Division Order of Battle
 War Diary Commander Royal Artillery 2nd Division

Notes

References

Royal Field Artillery brigades
Artillery units and formations of World War I